Ball Peninsula is a broad ice-covered peninsula on the north side of Thurston Island, Antarctica. It extends into Murphy Inlet between Noville Peninsula and Edwards Peninsula. It was named by the Advisory Committee on Antarctic Names after Lieutenant (junior grade) James L. Ball, PBM Mariner pilot in the Eastern Group of U.S. Navy Operation Highjump, which obtained aerial photographs of this peninsula and adjacent coastal areas, 1946–47. Ball commanded the January 11, 1947, search plane which, after 12 days of uncertainty, found the burned wreck and survivors of the Mariner crash on Noville Peninsula.

Maps
 Thurston Island – Jones Mountains. 1:500000 Antarctica Sketch Map. US Geological Survey, 1967.
 Antarctic Digital Database (ADD). Scale 1:250000 topographic map of Antarctica. Scientific Committee on Antarctic Research (SCAR). Since 1993, regularly upgraded and updated.

References
 

Peninsulas of Ellsworth Land